Wickes-class destroyers

Ships in class

USS Wickes (HMS Montgomery) 

 Designation:  Destroyer No. 75, DD-75, G95
 Builders:   (Bath Iron Works in Bath, Maine)
 Laid down:  26 June 1917
 Launched:  25 June 1918 (List)
 Operator:  
 Commissioned:  31 July 1918 (List)
 Decommissioned:  23 October 1940 (List)
 Operator:  
 Commissioned:  23 October 1940 (List)
 Decommissioned:  23 February 1944 (List)
 Fate:  Scrapped in the spring of 1945
 Operations:  World War I and II convoy escort
 Victories:

USS Philip (HMS Lancaster) 

 Designation:  Destroyer No. 76, DD-76, G05
 Builders:   (Bath Iron Works in Bath, Maine)
 Laid down:  1 September 1917
 Launched:  25 July 1918 (List)
 Operator:  
 Commissioned:  24 August 1918 (List)
 Decommissioned:  23 October 1940 (List)
 Operator:  
 Commissioned:  23 October 1940 (List)
 Decommissioned:  July 1945 (List)
 Fate:  Scrapped 1947
 Operations:  World War I convoy escort, World War II minelayer and escort

USS Woolsey 

 Designation:  Destroyer No. 77, DD-77
 Builders:   (Bath Iron Works in Bath, Maine)
 Laid down:  1 November 1917
 Launched:  17 September 1918 (List)
 Operator:  
 Commissioned:  30 September 1918 (List)
 Fate:  Sunk in a collision 21 February 1921 (List)
 Operations:  World War I convoy escort

USS Evans (HMS Mansfield) 

 Designation:  Destroyer No. 78, DD-78
 Builders:   (Bath Iron Works in Bath, Maine)
 Laid down:  28 December 1917
 Launched:  30 October 1918 (List)
 Operator:  
 Commissioned:  11 October 1918 (List)
 Decommissioned:  23 October 1940 (List)
 Commissioned:  23 October 1940 (List)
 Decommissioned:  22 June 1944 (List)
 Fate:  Scrapped 1945
 Operations:  World War I patrol, World War II convoy escort, Norwegian coastal raids
 Victories:

USS Little 

 Designation:  Destroyer No. 79, DD-79, APD-4
 Builders:   (Fore River Shipbuilding in Quincy, Massachusetts)
 Laid down:  18 June 1917
 Launched:  11 November 1917 (List)
 Operator:  
 Commissioned:  6 April 1918 (List)
 Fate:  Sunk by Japanese destroyers near Savo Island on 5 September 1942 (List)
 Operations:  World War I patrol, World War II convoy escort, Norwegian coastal raids
 Modifications:  Conversion to high-speed transport in 1940

USS Kimberly 

 Designation:  Destroyer No. 80, DD-80
 Builders:   (Fore River Shipbuilding in Quincy, Massachusetts)
 Laid down:  
 Launched:  14 December 1917 (List)
 Operator:  
 Commissioned:  26 April 1918 (List)
 Decommissioned:  30 June 1922 (List)
 Fate:  Sold for scrap 20 April 1939
 Operations:  World War I convoy escort

USS Sigourney (HMS Newport) 

 Designation:  Destroyer No. 81, DD-81
 Builders:   (Fore River Shipbuilding in Quincy, Massachusetts)
 Laid down:  25 August 1917
 Launched:  16 December 1917 (List)
 Operator:  
 Commissioned:  15 May 1918 (List)
 Decommissioned:  26 November 1940 (List)
 Operator:  , 
 Commissioned:  5 December 1940 (List)
 Decommissioned:  January 1945 (List)
 Fate:  Scrapped 26 June 1947
 Operations:  World War I convoy escort, World War II convoy escort and target ship

USS Gregory 

 Designation:  Destroyer No. 82, DD-82, APD-3
 Builders:   (Fore River Shipbuilding in Quincy, Massachusetts)
 Laid down:  25 August 1917
 Launched:  27 January 1918 (List)
 Operator:  
 Commissioned:  1 June 1918 (List)
 Fate:  Sunk near Guadalcanal 5 September 1942 (List)
 Operations:  World War I convoy escort, World War II fast transport

USS Stringham 

 Designation:  Destroyer No. 83, DD-83, APD-6
 Builders:   (Fore River Shipbuilding in Quincy, Massachusetts)
 Laid down:  19 September 1917
 Launched:  30 March 1918 (List)
 Operator:  
 Commissioned:  2 July 1918 (List)
 Decommissioned:  9 November 1945 (List)
 Fate:  Scrapped March 1946
 Operations:  World War I convoy escort, World War II fast transport

USS Dyer 

 Designation:  Destroyer No. 84, DD-84
 Builders:   (Fore River Shipbuilding in Quincy, Massachusetts)
 Laid down:  26 September 1917
 Launched:  13 April 1918 (List)
 Operator:  
 Commissioned:  1 July 1918 (List)
 Decommissioned:  7 June 1922 (List)
 Fate:  Sold for scrap 8 September 1936
 Operations:  World War I convoy escort, VIP transport

USS Colhoun 

 Designation:  Destroyer No. 85, DD-85, APD-2
 Builders:   (Fore River Shipbuilding in Quincy, Massachusetts)
 Laid down:  19 September 1917
 Launched:  21 February 1918 (List)
 Operator:  
 Commissioned:  13 June 1918 (List)
 Fate:  Sunk near Guadalcanal on 30 August 1942 (List)
 Operations:  World War I convoy escort, Guadalcanal high speed transport

USS Stevens 

 Designation:  Destroyer No. 86, DD-86
 Builders:   (Fore River Shipbuilding in Quincy, Massachusetts)
 Laid down:  20 September 1917
 Launched:  13 January 1918 (List)
 Operator:  
 Commissioned:  24 May 1918 (List)
 Decommissioned:  19 June 1922 (List)
 Fate:  Sold for scrap 8 September 1936
 Operations:  World War I convoy escort

USS McKee 

 Designation:  Destroyer No. 87, DD-87
 Builders:   (Union Iron Works in San Francisco, California)
 Laid down:  29 October 1917
 Launched:  23 March 1918 (List)
 Operator:  
 Commissioned:  7 September 1918 (List)
 Decommissioned:  16 June 1922 (List)
 Fate:  Sold for scrap 7 January 1936
 Operations:  World War I convoy escort

USS Robinson (HMS Newmarket) 

 Designation:  Destroyer No. 88, DD-88
 Builders:   (Union Iron Works in San Francisco, California)
 Laid down:  31 October 1917
 Launched:  28 March 1918 (List)
 Operator:  
 Commissioned:  19 October 1918 (List)
 Decommissioned:  3 August 1922 (List)
 Operator:   (as HMS Newmarket)
 Commissioned:  5 December 1940 (List)
 Decommissioned:  
 Fate:  Scrapped in September 1945
 Operations:  World War I convoy escort, Transatlantic flight plane guard, World War II convoy escort and aircraft target ship

USS Ringgold (HMS Newark) 

 Designation:  Destroyer No. 89, DD-89
 Builders:   (Union Iron Works in San Francisco, California)
 Laid down:  20 October 1917
 Launched:  14 April 1918 (List)
 Operator:  
 Commissioned:  14 November 1918 (List)
 Decommissioned:  17 June 1922 (List)
 Operator:   (as HMS Newark)
 Commissioned:  26 November 1940 (List)
 Decommissioned:  
 Fate:  Scrapped on 18 February 1947, Bo'ness, Scotland
 Operations:  World War I convoy escort, World War II convoy escort and aircraft target ship
 Victories:  Damaged one German submarine

USS McKean 

 Designation:  Destroyer No. 90, DD-90, APD-5
 Builders:   (Union Iron Works in San Francisco, California)
 Laid down:  12 February 1918
 Launched:  4 July 1918 (List)
 Operator:  
 Commissioned:  25 February 1919 (List)
 Fate:  Sunk near Bougainville on 17 November 1943 (List)
 Operations:  World War I convoy escort, Guadalcanal high speed transport

USS Harding 

 Designation:  Destroyer No. 91, DD-91
 Builders:   (Union Iron Works in San Francisco, California)
 Laid down:  12 February 1918
 Launched:  4 July 1918 (List)
 Operator:  
 Commissioned:  24 January 1919 (List)
 Decommissioned:  1 July 1922 (List)
 Fate:  Sold for scrap 8 September 1936
 Operations:  World War I convoy escort

USS Gridley 

 Designation:  Destroyer No. 92, DD-92
 Builders:   (Union Iron Works in San Francisco, California)
 Laid down:  1 April 1918
 Launched:  4 July 1918 (List)
 Operator:  
 Commissioned:  8 March 1919 (List)
 Decommissioned:  22 June 1922 (List)
 Fate:  Sold for scrap 19 April 1939
 Operations:  World War I convoy escort

USS Fairfax (HMS Richmond) — (later Soviet Zhivuchiy "Tenacious").  

 Designation:  Destroyer No. 93, DD-93
 Builders:   (Mare Island Navy Yard in Vallejo, California)
 Laid down:  10 July 1917
 Launched:  15 December 1917 (List)
 Operator:   (as USS Fairfax)
 Commissioned:  6 April 1918 (List)
 Decommissioned:  26 November 1940 (List)
 Commissioned:  5 December 1940 (List)
 Decommissioned:  16 July 1944 (List)
 Operator:   (as ''Zhivuchiy ("Tenacious"). 
 Commissioned:  16 July 1944 (List)
 Fate:  Scrapped 1949
 Operations:  World War I convoy escort, World War II Arctic and Atlantic convoy escort

USS Taylor 

 Designation:  Destroyer No. 94, DD-94, Damage Control Hulk No. 40
 Builders:   (Mare Island Navy Yard in Vallejo, California)
 Laid down:  15 October 1917
 Launched:  14 February 1918 (List)
 Operator:  
 Commissioned:  1 June 1918 (List)
 Decommissioned:  23 September 1938 (List)
 Fate:  Sold for scrap 8 August 1945
 Operations:  World War I convoy escort, Special Service Squadron, World War II damage control hulk

USS Bell 

 Designation:  Destroyer No. 95, DD-95
 Builders:   (Bethlehem Shipbuilding Corporation's Fore River Shipyard, Quincy, Massachusetts)
 Laid down:  16 November 1917
 Launched:  20 April 1918 (List)
 Operator:  
 Commissioned:  31 July 1918 (List)
 Decommissioned:  21 June 1922 (List)
 Fate:  Sold for scrap
 Operations:  World War I escort

USS Stribling 

 Designation:  Destroyer No. 96, DD-96, DM-1
 Builders:   (Fore River Shipbuilding in Quincy, Massachusetts)
 Laid down:  14 December 1917
 Launched:  29 May 1918 (List)
 Operator:  
 Commissioned:  16 August 1918 (List)
 Decommissioned:  26 June 1922 (List)
 Fate:  Sunk as a target
 Operations:  World War I escort, conversion to a destroyer minelayer

USS Murray 

 Designation:  Destroyer No. 97, DD-97, DM-2
 Builders:   (Fore River Shipbuilding in Quincy, Massachusetts)
 Laid down:  22 December 1917
 Launched:  8 June 1918 (List)
 Operator:  
 Commissioned:  21 August 1918 (List)
 Decommissioned:  1 July 1922 (List)
 Fate:  Sold for scrap 29 September 1936
 Operations:  World War I escort, conversion to a destroyer minelayer

USS Israel 

 Designation:  Destroyer No. 98, DD-98, DM-3
 Builders:   (Fore River Shipbuilding in Quincy, Massachusetts)
 Laid down:  26 January 1918
 Launched:  22 June 1918 (List)
 Operator:  
 Commissioned:  13 September 1918 (List)
 Decommissioned:  7 July 1922 (List)
 Fate:  Sold for scrap 18 April 1939
 Operations:  World War I escort, conversion to a destroyer minelayer

USS Luce 

 Designation:  Destroyer No. 99, DD-99, DM-4
 Builders:   (Fore River Shipbuilding in Quincy, Massachusetts)
 Laid down:  9 February 1918
 Launched:  29 June 1918 (List)
 Operator:  
 Commissioned:  11 September 1918 (List)
 Decommissioned:  31 January 1931 (List)
 Fate:  Sold for scrap 13 November 1936
 Operations:  World War I Mediterranean escort, Food Commission patrol, conversion to a destroyer minelayer, Canal Zone Control Force

USS Maury 

 Designation:  Destroyer No. 100, DD-100, DM-5
 Builders:   (Fore River Shipbuilding in Quincy, Massachusetts)
 Laid down:  4 May 1918
 Launched:  4 July 1918 (List)
 Operator:  
 Commissioned:  23 September 1918 (List)
 Decommissioned:  19 March 1930 (List)
 Fate:  Sold for scrap 1 May 1934
 Operations:  World War I Mediterranean patrol, conversion to a destroyer minelayer

USS Lansdale 

 Designation:  Destroyer No. 101, DD-101, DM-6
 Builders:   (Fore River Shipbuilding in Quincy, Massachusetts)
 Laid down:  20 April 1918
 Launched:  21 July 1918 (List)
 Operator:  
 Commissioned:  26 October 1918 (List)
 Decommissioned:  24 March 1931 (List)
 Fate:  Sold for scrap 28 December 1936
 Operations:  World War I Atlantic and Mediterranean patrol, conversion to a destroyer minelayer

USS Mahan 

 Designation:  Destroyer No. 102, DD-102, DM-7
 Builders:   (Fore River Shipbuilding in Quincy, Massachusetts)
 Laid down:  4 May 1918
 Launched:  4 August 1918 (List)
 Operator:  
 Commissioned:  24 October 1918 (List)
 Decommissioned:  1 May 1930 (List)
 Fate:  Sold for scrap 22 October 1930
 Operations:  World War I Caribbean patrol, conversion to a destroyer minelayer

USS Schley 

 Designation:  Destroyer No. 103, DD-103, APD-14
 Builders:   (Fore River Shipbuilding in Quincy, Massachusetts)
 Laid down:  29 October 1917
 Launched:  28 March 1918 (List)
 Operator:  
 Commissioned:  20 September 1918 (List)
 Decommissioned:  9 November 1945 (List)
 Fate:  Sold for scrap 1946
 Operations:  World War I Mediterranean patrol, Attack on Pearl Harbor, World War II fast transport

USS Champlin 

 Designation:  Destroyer No. 104, DD-104
 Builders:   (Union Iron Works in San Francisco, California)
 Laid down:  31 October 1917
 Launched:  7 April 1918 (List)
 Operator:  
 Commissioned:  11 November 1918 (List)
 Decommissioned:  7 June 1922 (List)
 Fate:  Sunk in trials 12 April 1936
 Operations:  Training operations

USS Mugford 

 Designation:  Destroyer No. 105, DD-105
 Builders:   (Union Iron Works in San Francisco, California)
 Laid down:  20 December 1917
 Launched:  14 April 1918 (List)
 Operator:  
 Commissioned:  25 November 1918 (List)
 Decommissioned:  7 June 1922 (List)
 Fate:  Sold for scrap in 1936
 Operations:  Peacetime operations

USS Chew 

 Designation:  Destroyer No. 106, DD-106
 Builders:   (Union Iron Works in San Francisco, California)
 Laid down:  2 January 1918
 Launched:  26 May 1918 (List)
 Operator:  
 Commissioned:  12 December 1918 (List)
 Decommissioned:  10 October 1945 (List)
 Fate:  4 October 1946 Sold
 Operations:  Attack on Pearl Harbor, Pearl Harbor area patrol

USS Hazelwood 

 Designation:  Destroyer No. 107, DD-107
 Builders:   (Union Iron Works in San Francisco, California)
 Laid down:  24 December 1917
 Launched:  22 June 1918 (List)
 Operator:  
 Commissioned:  20 February 1919 (List)
 Decommissioned:  15 November 1930 (List)
 Fate:  Scrapped, 14 April 1930
 Operations:  None

USS Williams (HMCS St. Clair) 

 Designation:  Destroyer No. 108, DD-108, I-65
 Builders:   (Union Iron Works in San Francisco, California)
 Laid down:  25 March 1918
 Launched:  4 July 1918 (List)
 Operator:  
 Commissioned:  1 March 1919 (List)
 Decommissioned:  24 September 1940 (List)
 Operator:  
 Commissioned:  24 September 1940 (List)
 Decommissioned:  August 1944 (List)
 Fate:  Scrapped 6 October 1946
 Operations:  Neutrality Patrol, World War II Atlantic convoy escort, submarine depot ship, damage control hulk

USS Crane 

 Designation:  Destroyer No. 109, DD-109
 Builders:   (Union Iron Works in San Francisco, California)
 Laid down:  7 January 1918
 Launched:  4 July 1918 (List)
 Operator:  
 Commissioned:  18 April 1919 (List)
 Decommissioned:  14 November 1945 (List)
 Fate:  Sold for scrap 1 November 1946
 Operations:  Neutrality Patrol, World War II US Pacific Coast patrol and training operations

USS Hart 

 Designation:  Destroyer No. 110, DD-110
 Builders:   (Union Iron Works in San Francisco, California)
 Laid down: 8 January 1918
 Launched:  4 July 1918 (List)
 Operator:  
 Commissioned:  26 May 1919 (List)
 Decommissioned:  1 June 1931 (List)
 Fate:  Sold for scrap 25 February 1932
 Operations:  Asiatic Fleet

USS Ingraham 

 Designation:  Destroyer No. 111, DD-111, DM-9
 Builders:   (Union Iron Works in San Francisco, California)
 Laid down: 12 January 1918
 Launched:  4 July 1918 (List)
 Operator:  
 Commissioned:  15 May 1919 (List)
 Decommissioned:  29 June 1922 (List)
 Fate:  Sold for scrap
 Operations:  Minelayer conversion

USS Ludlow 

 Designation:  Destroyer No. 112, DD-112, DM-10
 Builders:   (Union Iron Works in San Francisco, California)
 Laid down:  7 January 1918
 Launched:  9 June 1918 (List)
 Operator:  
 Commissioned:  23 December 1918 (List)
 Decommissioned:  24 May 1930 (List)
 Fate:  Sold for scrap 10 March 1931
 Operations:  Minelayer conversion

USS Rathburne 

 Designation:  Destroyer No. 113, DD-113, APD-25
 Builders:   (William Cramp & Sons in Philadelphia)
 Laid down:  12 July 1917
 Launched:  17 December 1917 (List)
 Operator:  
 Commissioned:  24 June 1918 (List)
 Decommissioned:  2 November 1945 (List)
 Fate:  Sold for scrap November 1946
 Operations:  World War I convoy escort; Asiatic Fleet; World War II training ship and high speed transport
 Victories:  2 Japanese aircraft

USS Talbot 

 Designation:  Destroyer No. 114, DD-114, APD-7
 Builders:   (William Cramp & Sons in Philadelphia)
 Laid down:  12 July 1917
 Launched:  20 February 1918 (List)
 Operator:  
 Commissioned:  20 July 1918 (List)
 Decommissioned:  9 October 1945 (List)
 Fate:  Sold for scrap 30 January 1946
 Operations:  World War II high speed transport

USS Waters 

 Designation:  Destroyer No. 115, DD-115, APD-8
 Builders:   (William Cramp & Sons in Philadelphia)
 Laid down:  26 July 1917
 Launched:  3 March 1918 (List)
 Operator:  
 Commissioned:  8 August 1918 (List)
 Decommissioned:  12 October 1945 (List)
 Fate:  Sold for scrap 10 May 1946
 Operations:  World War I convoy escort, World War II high speed transport

USS Dent 

 Designation:  Destroyer No. 116, DD-116, APD-9
 Builders:   (William Cramp & Sons in Philadelphia)
 Laid down:  30 August 1917
 Launched:  23 March 1918 (List)
 Operator:  
 Commissioned:  9 September 1918 (List)
 Decommissioned:  4 December 1945 (List)
 Fate:  Sold for scrap 13 June 1946
 Operations:  World War I convoy escort, World War II high speed transport

USS Dorsey 

 Designation:  Destroyer No. 117, DD-117, DMS-1
 Builders:   (William Cramp & Sons in Philadelphia)
 Laid down:  18 September 1917
 Launched:  9 April 1918 (List)
 Operator:  
 Commissioned:  16 September 1918 (List)
 Decommissioned:  8 December 1945 (List)
 Fate:  Grounded by a typhoon 9 October 1945 (List) and destroyed 1 January 1946
 Operations:  World War I convoy escort, World War II high speed mine-sweeper

USS Lea 

 Designation:  Destroyer No. 118, DD-118
 Builders:   (William Cramp & Sons in Philadelphia)
 Laid down:  18 September 1918
 Launched:  29 April 1918 (List)
 Operator:  
 Commissioned:  2 October 1918 (List)
 Decommissioned:  20 July 1945 (List)
 Fate:  Sold for scrapping 30 November 1946
 Operations:  World War II convoy escort and training ship

USS Lamberton 

 Designation:  Destroyer No. 119, DD-119, AG-21, DMS-2
 Builders:   (Newport News Shipbuilding Company in Newport News, Virginia)
 Laid down:  1 October 1917
 Launched:  30 March 1918 (List)
 Operator:  
 Commissioned:  22 August 1918 (List)
 Decommissioned:  13 December 1946 (List)
 Fate:  Sold for scrapping 9 May 1949
 Operations:  Gunnery training, minesweeping, Aleutian Campaign

USS Radford 

 Designation:  Destroyer No. 120, DD-120, AG-22
 Builders:   (Newport News Shipbuilding Company in Newport News, Virginia)
 Laid down:  2 October 1917
 Launched:  5 April 1918 (List)
 Operator:  
 Commissioned:  30 September 1918 (List)
 Decommissioned:  9 June 1922 (List)
 Fate:  Sunk in accordance with the London Treaty on 5 August 1936
 Operations:  World War I convoy escort

USS Montgomery 
 Designation:  Destroyer No. 121, DD-121, DM-17
 Builders:   (Newport News Shipbuilding Company in Newport News, Virginia)
 Laid down:  2 October 1917
 Launched:  23 March 1918 (List)
 Operator:  
 Commissioned:  26 July 1918 (List)
 Decommissioned:  23 April 1945 (List)
 Fate:  Sold for scrap 11 March 1946
 Operations:  World War I convoy escort, World War II minelayer and patrols, Solomons, Aleutian, Kwajalein, Peleliu

USS Breese 

 Designation:  Destroyer No. 122, DD-122, DM-18
 Builders:   (Newport News Shipbuilding Company in Newport News, Virginia)
 Laid down:  10 November 1917
 Launched:  11 May 1918 (List)
 Operator:  
 Commissioned:  23 October 1918 (List)
 Decommissioned:  15 January 1946 (List)
 Fate:  Sold for scrap 16 May 1946
 Operations:  World War I convoy escort, minelayer conversion, Attack on Pearl Harbor, Solomons, Leyte, Lingayen Gulf, Okinawa

USS Gamble

USS Ramsay

USS Tattnall

USS Badger

USS Twiggs (HMS Leamington) - (Later Soviet Zhguchiy: "Firebrand").

USS Babbitt

USS DeLong

USS Jacob Jones

USS Buchanan (HMS Campbeltown) 

 Designation:  Destroyer No. 131, DD-131.
 Builders:   (Bath Iron Works in Bath, Maine)
 Laid down:  29 June 1918
 Launched:  2 January 1919 (List)
 Operator:  
 Commissioned:  20 January 1919 (List)
 Decommissioned:  9 September 1940 (List)
 Operator:  
 Commissioned:  9 September 1940 (List)
 Fate:  Deliberately destroyed in St Nazaire Raid 28 March 1942
 Operations:  World War I and II convoy escort. Famed for destroying the Normandie Dry Dock gates at St Nazaire

USS Aaron Ward 

 Designation: Destroyer No. 132, DD-132
 Builders:
 Laid down:
 Launched:
 Operator:
 Commissioned:
 Decommissioned:

USS Hale

USS Crowninshield (HMS Chelsea) - (Later Soviet Derzkiy: "Ardent")

USS Tillman 

A further 50 ships were built.

Tabulated details

References

External links 
Wickes-class destroyers at Destroyer History Foundation
The Pacific War: The U.S. Navy, page for Wickes class

ja:ウィックス級駆逐艦
pt:Classe Wickes